Strozzi is an Italian surname. Notable people with the surname include:

 Numerous members of the Strozzi family, an ancient later ennobled family from Florence
 Alessandra Macinghi Strozzi (c. 1408–1471), an Italian businesswoman and aristocrat
 Barbara Strozzi (1619–1677), an Italian singer and composer
 Filippo Strozzi the Elder (1428–1491), an Italian banker and aristocrat
 Filippo Strozzi the Younger (1489–1538), an Italian banker and aristocrat
 Filippo di Piero Strozzi (1541–1582), an Italian military officer
 Giulio Strozzi (1583-1652), a Venetian poet and libretto writer
 Leone Strozzi (1515–1554), an Italian military officer
 Lorenzo Strozzi (1513–1571), an Italian clergyman
 Palla Strozzi (1372–1462), an Italian aristocrat
  (1626–1664), an Austrian nobleman and general
 Piero Strozzi (c. 1510–1558), an Italian military officer
 Piero Strozzi (composer), an Italian aristocrat and composer
 Bernardo Strozzi (c. 1581–1644), an Italian Baroque painter and engraver
  (1882–1962), a Croatian opera singer
 Marija Ružička Strozzi (1850–1937), a Croatian actress
  (1892–1970), a Croatian actor and writer
 Zanobi Strozzi (1412-1468), an Italian Renaissance painter and manuscript illuminator

Italian-language surnames